Homer Alex McCrerey (July 29, 1919 – 1999) became U.S. Navy Meteorologist and oceanographer for CINCPACFLT until 1972.

Biography
US Navy Captain McCrerey was born in Hiawatha, Brown County, Kansas. During 1941 he graduated from Baker University in Baldwin City, Kansas with a mathematics degree.  Homer was commissioned at the US Naval Academy in 1942. He completed Naval Postgraduate School in 1952. For over 20 years, he advanced both the art and science of computer-aided mathematical modeling that improved global weather forecasting.

He served in the Navy during World War II as ship's engineer on USS Strive and later as a meteorologist in the Naval Weather Service. He served as commanding officer of Fleet Weather Central at several posts. He was decorated nine times during his 31-year career and received a United Nations Service Medal and a National Defense Service Medal.

During his tour with CINCPACFLT while based at Pearl Harbor, Hawaii, McCrerey interacted with mid-Pacific Ocean near-peer mentors to help ensure highly effective NASA Apollo Program Command Capsule Recoveries coordinated by Pacific Recovery Forces.

See also
 Military meteorology
 CDC 1604 at FOCCPAC Kunia, Hawaii
 List of United States Naval Academy alumni
 University_of_Kansas#Computing_innovations

1919 births
1999 deaths
American meteorologists
United States Navy officers
Baker University alumni
Naval Postgraduate School alumni
American oceanographers
People from Hiawatha, Kansas
United States Navy personnel of World War II
Scientists from Kansas